The Campeonato Paulista de Basquete Masculino (English: Men's São Paulo State Basketball Championship), is an annual men's professional club basketball competition. The tournament is contested between clubs from São Paulo State.

History
The first major Paulista State basketball tournament, known as the Paulistano Championship or Capitol Championship, was played in 1925. The tournament existed until 1977. In 1932, the Paulista State Championship began.

Paulista (São Paulo) State champions

Titles by club

See also
New Basket Brazil (NBB)
Brazilian Championship
Rio de Janeiro State Championship

References

External links
Paulista Basketball Federation official website 
Paulista State Championship History 
Paulista State Championship at Latinbasket.com
New Basket Brazil official website 
Basketball Brazil official website  

1932 establishments in Brazil
Campeonato Paulista de Basquete
São Paulo
Sports leagues established in 1932